The list of early-modern periodicals gives an overview of periodicals (newspapers are excluded) for the period from the first printed books to 1800. The list includes periodical publications such as catalogues and some works which appeared in a longer time frame, such as the Theatrum Europaeum.

Established 1600–1699

Established 1700–1750

Established 1750–1799

See also 

 Moral Weekly
 List of early modern newspapers

Notes

Literature 
 M. P. H., Curieuse Nachricht von denen heute zu Tage grand mode gewordenen Journal- Quartal- und Annual-Schrifften (Freyburg Jena, 1716).
 H. P. L. M., Gründliche Nachricht von den frantzösischen, lateinischen und deutschen Journalen, Ephemeridibus, monatlichen Extracten, oder wie sie sonsten Nahmen haben mögen (Leipzig/ Gardeleben: H. Campe, 1718).
 Thomas Habel, Gelehrte Journale und Zeitungen der Aufklärung. Zur Entstehung, Entwicklung und Erschließung deutschsprachiger Rezensionszeitschriften des 18. Jahrhunderts (Bremen: Ed. Lumière, 2007), .
 17th-18th Century Burney Collection Newspapers Title List

External links
 Eighteenth Century Journals. A Portal to Newspapers and Periodicals c.1685–1815. [restricted access]
 Retrospektive Digitalisierung wissenschaftlicher Rezensionsorgane und Literaturzeitschriften des 18. und 19. Jahrhunderts aus dem deutschen Sprachraum. Universitätsbibliothek Bielefeld 2000–2008 Start page list
 Zeitschriftendatenbank (ZDB) Opac

Lists of publications